is a Japanese singer, model, and radio personality. She is a member of Japanese idol group Hinatazaka46, represented by Sony Music Records, as well as an exclusive model for the fashion magazine CanCam.

Career

Music 
Katō's musical career began on 11 May 2016, when she passed the auditions for new members of Keyakizaka46's subgroup Hiragana Keyakizaka46, which was hosted on the streaming platform Showroom. Katō, along with ten other people that passed the audition, joined Neru Nagahama in Hiragana Keyakizaka46 and was known as the "first generation". Her first concert occurred on 28 October of the same year at Akasaka Blitz, where she performed Kanji Keyakizaka46's songs "Silent Majority" and "Sekai ni wa Ai Shika Nai", as well as Hiragana Keyakizaka46's own "Hiragana Keyaki".

During her time at Hiragana Keyakizaka46, she has consistently appeared in every single between "Sekai ni wa Ai Shika Nai" and "Kuroi Hitsuji", including a center position in the song "Happy Aura", a B-side for the single "Ambivalent". She also appeared in the Sakamichi AKB song "Kokkyo no Nai Jidai", which included selected members of AKB48 and the Sakamichi Series. With this appearamce, Katō became the first Hiragana Keyakizaka46 member to be included in a Sakamichi AKB song, excluding Neru Nagahama.

After Hiragana Keyakizaka46 was renamed into Hinatazaka46, Katō has also appeared in every single to date, including another Sakamichi AKB song, "Hatsukoi Door". She was chosen as the center for the title track of the 5th single "Kimi Shika Katan".

Modeling 
Katō made her runway debut at the GirlsAward 2017 Autumn/Winter fashion show. In February 2019, she became an exclusive model for the fashion magazine CanCam, and appeared on the cover of the October edition with Nogizaka46 members Sayuri Matsumura and Mizuki Yamashita as the "Three Sakamichi Sisters".

Discography

Keyakizaka46 singles

Keyakizaka46 albums 
The songs listed below are not included in any singles above.

Hinatazaka46 singles

Sakamichi AKB

Videography

Video albums

Filmography

Web series

Variety and talk shows

Radio

References

External links 
  
  (August 2, 2016 - ) 
  on Showroom 
  (February 2, 2022 - ) 

Japanese idols
Hinatazaka46 members
Japanese female models
Musicians from Tokyo
1998 births
Living people